Mountain Dew, a citrus-flavored carbonated soft drink now owned by PepsiCo, has had numerous branded flavor variants since the original formula's creation in 1940. Notable variants include Baja Blast, Diet Mountain Dew, Code Red, LiveWire, Voltage, Major Melon, and Spark.

Flavors

Current

Exclusives

Kickstart

Game Fuel (formerly Amp Game Fuel)

Mountain Dew Energy (formerly Mountain Dew Rise)

Hard Mountain Dew

Frozen beverages

International variations

Discontinued

See also
 List of citrus soft drinks
 Surge

References

External links
 
 Mountain Dew nutritional facts and other information via PepsiCo

 
Mountain Dew
PepsiCo brands
PepsiCo soft drinks
Products introduced in 1940
Products introduced in the 20th century